Hannes Agnarsson (born 26 February 1999) is a Faroese football player, who plays for B36 Tórshavn, on loan from Danish 2nd Division club HIK.

International career
He made his debut for the Faroe Islands national football team on 9 October 2021 in a World Cup qualifier against Austria.

References

External links
 
 

1999 births
Living people
Faroese footballers
Faroese expatriate footballers
Faroe Islands youth international footballers
Faroe Islands under-21 international footballers
Faroe Islands international footballers
Association football forwards
B36 Tórshavn players
Hellerup IK players
Faroe Islands Premier League players
Danish 2nd Division players
Expatriate men's footballers in Denmark